The Six Flags Magic Mountain Sky Tower is a 385-foot-tall (117 m) observation tower located in the Samurai Summit section of Six Flags Magic Mountain. The tower closed in 2014.

History
Construction for the Sky Tower started in October 1970, one year prior to Magic Mountains' opening. The ride opened in 1971, the same year the park opened. The tower was built by Intamin AG, as a Hexagonal Tower. The tower is made of 460-tons of steel, has two-observation decks and a red-paint scheme. The tower was also designed to withstand strong 100 MPH winds.

During the 1970s, the tower had a multi-colored rainbow-paint scheme, but was then later repainted to a red-paint scheme.

In 2008, the Sky Tower received the "Magic of the Mountain" museum at the top of the tower. An attraction that contained memorabilia throughout the parks history including old television commercials, old park maps, old photographs, models, and equipment saved from past/defunct rides.

During the Holiday in the Park season, the Sky Tower is decorated as a Christmas Tree.

Closure
In 2014, the Sky Tower was forced to be closed by the state of California, due to the safety requirements regarding the ride's elevator. In order to have reopened it, the ride would need a multi-million dollar upgrade to the elevator to bring it up to the safety code as an amusement park ride. However, the park has not apportioned funds to the multi-million dollar project. As a result, the ride has stood vacant for the past 8 years.

In August 2020, when the park was shuttered during the COVID-19 lockdown, a duo of two local teenagers broke into the park, and climbed up the tower to the observation deck, spraying the inside of the observation deck with fire extinguishers, dangling from the edge, pouring gallons of paint on the midways, and tossing objects to the ground 30 stories below. The duo were arrested on August 28 on suspicion of felony vandalism costing more than $3,000.

References 

Towers completed in 1971
Amusement rides introduced in 1971
Amusement rides manufactured by Intamin
Six Flags attractions
Six Flags Magic Mountain
Observation towers in the United States